Prata Sannita is a comune (municipality) in the Province of Caserta in the Italian region Campania, located about  north of Naples and about  northwest of Caserta.

Prata Sannita borders the following municipalities: Ailano, Ciorlano, Fontegreca, Gallo Matese, Letino, Pratella, Raviscanina, and Valle Agricola.

References

Cities and towns in Campania